Zack Sidhu (born October 21, 1991) is an American pair skater. With Jessica Calalang, he won three medals on the ISU Challenger Series – bronze at the 2014 CS Skate Canada Autumn Classic and silver at the 2014 and 2016 CS U.S. International Classic. The pair also won silver at the 2013 International Cup of Nice.

Personal life 
Zack Sidhu was born on October 21, 1991 in San Dimas, California. He is interested in software engineering.

Career 
Sidhu skated with Arielle Trujillo from 2001 to 2003 and with Jennifer Osibov in 2005. He and Tori Vollmer teamed up in 2008 and competed in one ISU Junior Grand Prix event before splitting in 2010.

Sidhu teamed up with Jessica Calalang in August 2010. They made their JGP debut in 2010 in Ostrava, Czech Republic. The following season, they won a bronze medal at the 2011 JGP competition in Tallinn, Estonia. After winning the junior silver medal at the 2013 U.S. Championships, they were assigned to the 2013 World Junior Championships in Milan, Italy, where they finished ninth.

Calalang/Sidhu moved up to the senior level in the 2013–14 season. They won silver at the 2013 International Cup of Nice but finished 11th at the 2014 U.S. Championships. The pair began the following season on the ISU Challenger Series, winning silver at the 2014 CS U.S. International Classic and bronze at the 2014 CS Skate Canada Autumn Classic, before making their Grand Prix debut at the 2014 Cup of China.

Programs

With Calalang

With Vollmer

Competitive highlights 
GP: Grand Prix; CS: Challenger Series; JGP: Junior Grand Prix

With Calalang

With Vollmer

References

External links 
 

1991 births
American male pair skaters
Living people
People from San Dimas, California
20th-century American people
21st-century American people